Afrobeat: New Black British Fiction was a 1999 anthology of Black British writing edited by Patsy Antoine. It was published in London by Pulp Faction.

Afrobeat featured contributions from new writers, from Saga Prize winners Joanna Traynor and Judith Bryan, and work by Kadija Sesay and Yinka Sunmonu. Twelve of the fifteen constributors were women. Topics treated included HIV, racism, confessional television shows, obsession and new racism.

Contents
 Roger Robinson, "Glow"
 Judith Bryan, "The roaring man"
 Patricia Cumper, "True love"
 Courttia Newland, "The Great white hate"
 Patsy Antoine, "Joy"
 J. J. Amoworo Wilson, "Johnny can sleep easy now"
 Lucas Loblack, "The car"
 Natalie Stewart, "Who am I?"
 Kadija Sesay, "The price of maybe"
 Deborah Ricketts, "White walls"
 Brenda Emmanus, "Trust me"
 Joanna Traynor, "Crates"
 Yinka Sunmonu, "A good buy"
 Norma Pollock, "The negative"
 Norma Pollock, "A suitable candidate"

References

1999 books
British anthologies
Black British literature